FC Luch Minsk (translit. FK Pramyen' Minsk, 'lightning') is a Belarusian football club based in Minsk.

History
The team was founded in 2012 under the name ALF-2007 Minsk as a selection of best players from Minsk-based Amateur Football League (independent from BFF), which itself was founded in 2007 (hence the team name). The team spent one successful season in BFF-sanctioned Minsk Championship and was accepted to Belarusian Second League since 2013. In 2014, they took the name Luch Minsk. In 2015, the team was promoted to the Belarusian First League and in 2018 they made their debut in Belarusian Premier League.

In spring 2019, the club merged with Dnepr Mogilev. The united club was named Dnyapro Mogilev. It inherited Luch's Premier League spot and licence, their sponsorships and most of the squad, while keeping only a few of Dnepr players and relocating to Mogilev. Dnepr continued its participation in youth tournaments independently from Luch.

References

External links
Club official website
Amateur Football League website

Football clubs in Minsk
Football clubs in Belarus
Association football clubs established in 2012
2012 establishments in Belarus